, fifty-four United States astronauts have graduated from the United States Naval Academy (USNA), more than from any other undergraduate institution. The Naval Academy is an undergraduate college in Annapolis, Maryland, with the mission of educating and commissioning officers for the United States Navy and Marine Corps. During the latter half of the 19th century and the first decades of the 20th, the United States Naval Academy was the primary source of U.S. Navy and Marine Corps officers, with the class of 1881 being the first to provide officers to the Marine Corps. Graduates of the Academy are also given the option of entering the United States Army or United States Air Force; known as cross-commissioning. Most Midshipmen are admitted through the congressional appointment system. The curriculum emphasizes various fields of engineering. Graduates who enter aviation and space-related fields have the opportunity to be selected for astronaut training by the National Aeronautics and Space Administration (NASA).

This list is drawn from graduates of the Naval Academy who became astronauts. The Academy was founded in 1845 and graduated its first class in 1846. The first alumnus to fly as an astronaut was Alan Shepard, of the class of 1945. , the most recent alumnus to be selected as an astronaut was Kayla Barron, of the class of 2010. Two alumni were part of Project Mercury, three were part of Project Gemini, seven were part of the Apollo program, three walked on the Moon, one was part of the Apollo–Soyuz Test Project, and forty-two were part of the Space Shuttle program.

In addition to the 52 astronauts who are alumni of the Academy, more than 990 noted scholars from a variety of academic fields are Academy graduates, including 45 Rhodes Scholars and 16 Marshall Scholars. Additional notable graduates include 1 President of the United States, 2 Nobel Prize recipients, and 73 Medal of Honor recipients.



Astronauts
In this table, "class year" refers to the alumni's class year, which usually is the same year they graduated. However, in times of war, classes often graduated early. For example, the Class of 1943 actually graduated in 1942. (Note: The United States Air Force Academy did not graduate its first class until 1959, so a significant percentage of USNA graduates were commissioned in the US Air Force until that time.)

References
General

Inline citations

United States Naval Academy
Astronauts